Proverbs 15 is the fifteenth chapter of the Book of Proverbs in the Hebrew Bible or the Old Testament of the Christian Bible. The book is a compilation of several wisdom literature collections, with the heading in 1:1 may be intended to regard Solomon as the traditional author of the whole book, but the dates of the individual collections are difficult to determine, and the book probably obtained its final shape in the post-exilic period. This chapter is a part of the second collection of the book.

Text
The original text is written in Hebrew language. This chapter is divided into 33 verses.

Textual witnesses
Some early manuscripts containing the text of this chapter in Hebrew are of the Masoretic Text, which includes the Aleppo Codex (10th century), and Codex Leningradensis (1008). Fragments containing parts of this chapter in Hebrew were found among the Dead Sea Scrolls including 4Q103 (4QProv; 30 BCE – 30 CE) with extant verses 1–8, 19–31.

There is also a translation into Koine Greek known as the Septuagint, made in the last few centuries BC. Extant ancient manuscripts of the Septuagint version include Codex Vaticanus (B; B; 4th century), Codex Sinaiticus (S; BHK: S; 4th century), and Codex Alexandrinus (A; A; 5th century).

Analysis
This chapter belongs to a section regarded as the second collection in the book of Proverbs (comprising Proverbs 10:1–22:16), also called "The First 'Solomonic' Collection" (the second one in Proverbs 25:1–29:27). The collection contains 375 sayings, each of which consists of two parallel phrases, except for Proverbs 19:7 which consists of three parts.

Verse 1
A soft answer turns away wrath,
but a harsh word stirs up anger.
"Soft”: from the Hebrew adjective , rakh, "soft; tender; gentle”; in conjunction to an "answer" provides a meaning of 'more than a mild response' but 'conciliatory response that restores good temper and reasonableness', as illustrated by Gideon in his answer (Judges 8:1-3) that brings peace.
"Harsh": from the Hebrew noun , ʿetsev, “pain, hurt” that functions as an attributive genitive referring to 'something that causes pain', as illustrated by Jephthah's harsh answer which led to war (Judges 12:1-6).
This verse contrasts a conciliatory reply that soothes a situation leading to reasoned discussion and the acrimonious reply that inflames a situation and makes intelligent
discussion impossible.

Verse 4
A gentle tongue is a tree of life,
but perverseness in it breaks the spirit.
"Gentle": in Hebrew literally, “a tongue of healing,” referring to 'speech that is therapeutic or soothing'.
This saying points that conciliatory or healing speech promotes life, in contrast with twisted or perverse speech, which may cause injury and bring death (cf. Proverbs 18:21).

Verse 23
A man has joy by the answer of his mouth,
and a word spoken in due season, how good it is!
"The answer of his mouth": this term parallels to 'the good word spoken in season', so it would refer to "a proper or fitting answer".
This saying praises how a timely word brings satisfaction for both the speaker and the hearer(s), because words spoken out of "due season' would be ineffective and counter-productive.

See also

Related Bible parts: Deuteronomy 12, Proverbs 7, Proverbs 16, Proverbs 22

References

Sources

External links
 Jewish translations:
 Mishlei - Proverbs - Chapter 15 (Judaica Press) translation [with Rashi's commentary] at Chabad.org
 Christian translations:
 Online Bible at GospelHall.org (ESV, KJV, Darby, American Standard Version, Bible in Basic English)
 Book of Proverbs Chapter 15 King James Version
  Various versions

15